Dorothy Jane Scott disappeared on May 28, 1980, in Anaheim, California. She had driven two co-workers to the hospital after one had been bitten by a spider. While they were waiting for a prescription to be filled, Scott went to get her car to bring it around to meet them. Her car approached them, but it sped away; neither could see who was driving as its headlights had blinded them. They reported her missing a couple of hours later, after not hearing from her. In the preceding months, Scott had been receiving anonymous phone calls from a man who had reportedly been stalking her. He had threatened to get her alone and "cut [her] up into bits so no one will ever find [her]".

In June 1980, a man called the Orange County Register, a local newspaper that had published a story on the disappearance, and claimed that he had killed Scott. Police believe the caller was Scott's killer. From 1980 to 1984, Scott's mother Vera also received phone calls from a man who claimed to have Scott or to have killed her. None of the calls could be traced, however, because the caller would not stay on the line long enough. In August 1984, partial remains were found and later identified as Scott's. No arrests have been made in Scott's case.

Background
Dorothy Jane Scott (born April 23, 1948) was a single mother living in Stanton, California, with her aunt and four-year-old son. She was a secretary for two jointly-owned Anaheim stores, one that sold psychedelic items (i.e. love beads, lava lamps) and the other a head shop. Co-workers and friends said she preferred staying at home, was a devout Christian, and did not drink or do drugs. Her parents, who lived in Anaheim, babysat their grandson while she worked. Scott's father, Jacob, said his daughter may have dated on occasion but had no steady boyfriend, as far as the family knew.

Months before her abduction, Scott had been receiving strange phone calls at work from an unidentified male. The caller alternately professed his love for her and his intent to kill her. Scott's mother recounted, "One day he called and said to go outside because he had something for her. She went out and there was a single dead red rose on the windshield of her car." Scott's mother said one call especially horrified her daughter. The man reportedly told Scott he would get her alone and "cut [her] up into bits so no one will ever find [her]". Because of the calls, Dorothy began considering the purchase of a handgun; about a week before her disappearance, she started taking karate lessons.

Disappearance and murder
At 9 p.m. on May 28, 1980, Scott was at an employee meeting at work. She noted co-worker Conrad Bostron did not look well and had a red mark on his arm. She and another co-worker, Pam Head, left the employee meeting to take Bostron to the emergency room at UC Irvine Medical Center. On the way to the hospital, they stopped by Scott's parents' house to check on her son. She also changed her black scarf to a red one. At the hospital, medical personnel determined Bostron had suffered a black widow spider bite and treated him; Head said she and Scott remained in the E.R. waiting room. At no time, Head said, did Scott leave her side.

Bostron was discharged around 11 p.m. and given a prescription. Scott offered to bring her car to the exit; she did not want Bostron to walk too far in his condition, as he was still not feeling well. Head said Scott used the restroom briefly before heading out to the parking lot. Head and Bostron filled his prescription and waited at the exit for Scott; when they did not see her after a few minutes they went out to the E.R.'s parking lot. Suddenly, they saw Scott's car speeding toward them; its headlights blinded them so they could not see who was behind the wheel. They waved their arms to try to get Scott's attention, but the car sped past them and took a sharp right turn out of the parking lot. Initially, both thought Scott had an emergency come up with her son. A few hours later, after not hearing from her, Head and Bostron reported Scott missing.

Neither she nor her supposed kidnapper were anywhere nearby.

Discovery of remains
The bones were partly charred and authorities believed they had been there for two years, as a bushfire had "swept across the site" in 1982. A turquoise ring and watch were also found. Scott's mother said the watch had stopped at 12:30 a.m. on May 29, about an hour after Head and Bostron last saw Scott's vehicle. On August 14, the bones were identified as Scott's by dental records. An autopsy could not determine the cause of death. A memorial service was held on August 22.

Mysterious phone calls
About a week after Scott's disappearance, her parents received a phone call from an unidentified man who said, "I've got her" and hung up. The same man called "almost every Wednesday afternoon" and said either that he had Dorothy or had killed her. The calls were usually brief, and usually occurred when Vera was home alone. In April 1984, the man called during the evening; Jacob Scott answered and the calls stopped. After Scott's remains were found in August 1984, the family started receiving calls again. Police installed a voice recorder at the Scott residence. They were not able to trace the calls, however, because the man never stayed on the line long enough.

A possible motivation in Scott's murder surfaced June 12, 1980. An unidentified man called the front desk at the Orange County Register (the paper had run a story that day about the case). A managing editor told police the man said, "I killed her. I killed Dorothy Scott. She was my love. I caught her cheating with another man. She denied having someone else. I killed her." The editor also said the caller knew Conrad Bostron had suffered from a spider bite the night of May 28. He also knew that Scott had been wearing a red scarf; she had changed her black scarf to a red one after the employee meeting. Neither of these details had been published in the June 12 article. The caller also claimed Scott phoned him from the hospital that night. Pam Head disputed that claim, saying she had been with Scott the entire time and she had not made a phone call. Investigators believe the anonymous caller was responsible for Scott's death.

See also
List of solved missing person cases
List of unsolved murders

References

1980 in California
1980s missing person cases
1980 murders in the United States
20th century in Anaheim, California
Female murder victims
Formerly missing people
Incidents of violence against women
May 1980 events in the United States
Missing person cases in California
Unsolved murders in the United States
History of women in California
Stalking
Violence against women in the United States
People murdered in California